Allstones Peak is a  mountain summit located in the North Saskatchewan River valley of the Canadian Rockies of Alberta, Canada. Its nearest higher peak is Fence Post Peak,  to the west. Allstones Peak can be seen from David Thompson Highway and Abraham Lake. Precipitation runoff from Allstones Peak drains east into Abraham Lake, and northwest to Littlehorn Creek. Allstones Peak is composed of sedimentary rock laid down from the Precambrian to Jurassic periods that was pushed east and over the top of younger rock during the Laramide orogeny.


Climate

Based on the Köppen climate classification, Allstones Peak is located in a subarctic climate with cold, snowy winters, and mild summers.

See also
List of mountains of Canada
Geography of Alberta

References

External links
Scrambling Allstones Peak YouTube

Canadian Rockies
Two-thousanders of Alberta